McKinley Township is a civil township of Emmet County in the U.S. state of Michigan.  The population was 1,297 at the 2010 census. McKinley Township is home to Pellston Regional Airport.

Communities
The village of Pellston is partially within the township.
Van was established in 1898 as Egleston, and renamed in honor of the local Van Every family in 1898. A post office at Van lasted from 1898 to 1933.

Geography

Demographics
As of the census of 2000, there were 1,269 people, 459 households, and 330 families residing in the township. There were 572 housing units at an average density of 16.2 per square mile (6.3/km2). The racial makeup of the township was 90.46% White, 0.87% African American, 6.15% Native American, 0.16% Asian, 0.08% Pacific Islander, 0.08% from other races, and 2.21% from two or more races. Hispanic or Latino of any race were 0.87% of the population.

There were 459 households, out of which 37.9% had children under the age of 18 living with them, 55.8% were married couples living together, 10.9% had a female householder with no husband present, and 28.1% were non-families. 22.0% of all households were made up of individuals, and 8.7% had someone living alone who was 65 years of age or older.  The average household size was 2.76 and the average family size was 3.25.

In the township the population was spread out, with 32.4% under the age of 18, 6.9% from 18 to 24, 29.6% from 25 to 44, 20.3% from 45 to 64, and 10.8% who were 65 years of age or older.  The median age was 33 years. For every 100 females, there were 97.4 males.  For every 100 females age 18 and over, there were 94.1 males.

The median income for a household in the township was $32,961, and the median income for a family was $38,681. Males had a median income of $26,759 versus $20,179 for females. The per capita income for the township was $13,907.  About 11.9% of families and 13.9% of the population were below the poverty line, including 14.5% of those under age 18 and 15.6% of those age 65 or over.

References

Townships in Emmet County, Michigan
Townships in Michigan